The Battle of Day's Gap, fought on April 30, 1863, was the first in a series of American Civil War skirmishes in Cullman County, Alabama, that lasted until May 2, known as Streight's Raid. Commanding the Union forces was Col. Abel Streight; Brig. Gen. Nathan Bedford Forrest led the Confederate forces.

Background
The goal of Streight's raid was to cut off the Western & Atlantic Railroad, which supplied General Braxton Bragg's Confederate army in Middle Tennessee. Starting in Nashville, Tennessee, Streight and his men first traveled to Eastport, Mississippi, and then eastward to Tuscumbia, Alabama. On April 26, 1863, Streight left Tuscumbia and marched southeastward. Streight's initial movements were screened by Union Brig. Gen. Grenville Dodge's troops.

Battle
On April 30 at Day's Gap on Sand Mountain, Forrest caught up with Streight's expedition and attacked his rear guard. Streight's men managed to repulse this attack and as a result they continued their march to avoid any further delays and envelopments caused by the Confederate troops.

Aftermath
This battle set off a chain of skirmishes and engagements at Crooked Creek (April 30), Hog Mountain (April 30), Blountsville (May 1), Black Creek/Gadsden (May 2), and Blount's Plantation (May 2). Finally, on May 3, Forrest surrounded Streight's exhausted men 3 mi east of Cedar Bluff, Alabama, and forced their surrender. They were sent to Libby Prison in Richmond, Virginia. Streight and some of his men escaped on February 9, 1864.

The battle also led indirectly to the death of Confederate Lieutenant A. Wills Gould, an artillery officer of questionable competence, who left guns behind to be spiked by Union forces.  Gould was furious with Forrest's decision to transfer him to another command and fought an impromptu duel with him on June 14, 1863, in which Gould was killed.

Union order of battle
These regiments participated in Streight's raid:
 80th Illinois Infantry
 51st Indiana Infantry
 73rd Indiana Infantry
 3rd Ohio Infantry
 1st Middle Tennessee Cavalry (two companies)

Preservation
The Civil War Trust, a division of the American Battlefield Trust, and its partners have saved 40 acres of the battlefield at Hog Mountain, an associated battle that occurred on the same day as the Battle of Day's Gap.

Historian Fred Wise opened the Crooked Creek Civil War Museum on the land in which the skirmish at Crooked Creek took place. The museum houses numerous relics recovered from the property.

See also
Report of Col. Abel D. Streight, August 22, 1864.

References

 National Park Service battle description
 Eicher, David J., The Longest Night: A Military History of the Civil War, Simon & Schuster, 2001, .
 Update to the Civil War Sites Advisory Commission Report on the Nation's Civil War Battlefields - State of Alabama

External links
 Nathan Bedford Forrest Historical Society
 "Streight's Raid", Encyclopedia of Alabama website, accessed December 27, 2014.
 Abel D. Streight biographical sketch in Streight Family Collection, ca. 1850-ca. 1945, Indiana Historical Society
 The Civil War Battlefield Guide: Day's Gap
 History.com: Streight’s Raid begins
 Tuscaloosa News: Day's Gap Civil War site listed as 'at risk'

Cullman County, Alabama
Day's Gap
Day's Gap
Day's Gap
Day's Gap
The Lightning Mule Brigade
Day's Gap
1863 in Alabama
Nathan Bedford Forrest
April 1863 events